sdcv ( StarDict under Console Version) is the command line version of StarDict developed by  Evgeniy A. Dushistov and Hu Zheng. It employs all the dictionary files that belong to StarDict. It is licensed under the terms of the GNU General Public License.

Supported Platforms
sdcv runs under Linux, FreeBSD, and Solaris. As in StarDict, dictionaries of the user's choice have to be installed separately.

Main Usage

Synopsis
sdcv [ options ] [list of words]

Use "-h" option to view the message of whole options.

Description
sdcv is simple, cross-platform text-base utility for work with dictionaries in StarDict's format.  The word from  "list  of  words"  may  be string  with  leading  '/' for using Fuzzy search algorithm, string may contain '?' and '*' for using regexp search.  It  works  in  interactive and non-interactive mode. Press Ctrl+D to exit from interactive mode?

Environment
STARDICT_DATA_DIR
If set, sdcv uses this variable as  data  directory. In this example sdcv  searches  dictionaries in $STARDICT_DATA_DIR/dic.

See also

 StarDict
 Machine translation

External links
 Official website
 SourceForge.net project page

References 

DICT clients
Free dictionary software
Language software for Linux

ru:StarDict#Консольная версия SDCV
zh:星際譯王